The Aladdin Company was a pioneer in the pre-cut, mail order home industry. Sometimes referred to as Aladdin Readi-Cut Houses, the company was the first to offer a true kit house composed of precut, numbered pieces.  Its primary competitors were Montgomery Ward and Sears, Roebuck and Co. in the US and Eaton's in Canada. Two other kit home manufacturers, Lewis and Sterling, were also based in Bay City. Aladdin began operations in 1906 and ceased operations in 1987. In 2014 the rights to the company name and logo were acquired by Charles Munro and sold in 2018

History

Origins

Aladdin was founded by two brothers, W. J. Sovereign and O. E. Sovereign in Bay City, Michigan, after W. J. observed the success of the Brooks Boat Mfg. Co. in selling knock-down boats. The company began by selling boat houses, garages and summer cottages.

Almost immediately the company was also involved in the Canadian market, and eventually opened a branch office in the prestigious Canadian Pacific Building in Toronto, and several other regional offices in Canada.

Boom years

Aladdin quickly expanded to become one of largest mail-order house companies.  By 1915 sales surpassed $1 million.  In 1918 Aladdin alone accounted for 2.37 percent of all housing starts in the United States, around 1,800 homes.  The company's greatest success came from sales to industries which constructed company towns around new plants, mines and mills.  The town of Hopewell, Virginia was largely developed by the DuPont Company using Aladdin homes. In 1917 Aladdin shipped 252 houses to Birmingham, England for the Austin Motor Company who built Austin Village to house workers for munitions, tank and aircraft manufacture during World War I.

Decline

Aladdin began the development of a planned community called Aladdin City in southern Miami-Dade County, Florida, during the Florida land boom of the 1920s.  The collapse of the boom not long after construction had begun proved disastrous. Aladdin's output fell below 1000 homes in 1928 on the eve of the Great Depression, and never recovered.  It exited the Canadian market in 1952.  The company continued to produce catalogues, and maintained sales of a few hundred homes per year through the 1960s.  During the 1970s sales fell further and by 1982 the company ceased manufacturing.  The company ceased all operations in 1987.

Relaunch

In 2014, the Aladdin Company was re-established by Charles Munro and re-registered the original Company Trademark. The company was sold and changed management in 2018.

Contributions

The Aladdin Company, along with other catalogue-home businesses, played a key role in providing affordable housing to Americans in the period between the turn of the twentieth century and World War II.  It also made key advancements in the prefabrication of housing which would enable the post-war housing boom.  Finally, it helped to propagate preferences across the U.S. and Canada for common architectural styles such as the Craftsman, Bungalow, Four-Square and Cape Cod homes.

See also

 Kit house
 Sears Catalog Homes

References
Notes

Sources
 
 
 Roth, Ronica Built in a Day: Capturing the Era of Catalog Architecture, Humanities, Sept/Oct 1998 pp 26–31.
 Munro, Charles: May 30, 2014 - Sold By The Golden Rule.

External links
  Aladdin Company Archives, Clarke Historical Library
  Aladdin City, Florida
  A Brief History of the Aladdin Company
  The Process of Buying an Aladdin Home in 1950

Manufacturing companies established in 1906
Defunct retail companies of the United States
Manufactured home manufacturers
Manufacturing companies disestablished in 1987
Defunct retail companies of Canada
1906 establishments in Michigan
1987 disestablishments in Michigan
+Aladdin Company, The